The women's team pursuit speed skating competition of the 2018 Winter Olympics was held on 19 and 21 February 2018 at Gangneung Oval in Gangneung on 21 February 2018.

Records
Prior to this competition, the existing world, Olympic and track records were as follows.

The following records were set during this competition.

OR = Olympic record, TR = track record

Results

Quarterfinals
The quarterfinals were held on 19 February at 20:00.

Semifinals
The semifinals were held on 21 February at 20:00.

Finals
The finals were held on 21 February at 20:54.

References

Women's speed skating at the 2018 Winter Olympics